Bradley John Walsh (born 4 June 1960) is an English actor, comedian, singer, television presenter, and former professional footballer.

Walsh is known for his roles as Danny Baldwin in the ITV soap opera Coronation Street (2004–2006), as DS Ronnie Brooks in the police procedural series Law & Order: UK (2009–2014), and as Graham O'Brien in the BBC science fiction series Doctor Who (2018–2022). He has also presented various television game shows for ITV, including Wheel of Fortune (1997), The Chase (2009–present), Odd One In (2010–2011), Keep It in the Family (2014–2015), and Cash Trapped (2016–2019).

Walsh hosted the ITV variety show Tonight at the London Palladium (2016–2019) and was a team captain on the sports-themed panel show Play to the Whistle (2015–2017). He appeared as the coach in the 2001 comedy film Mike Bassett: England Manager. Since 2019, he has starred in Bradley Walsh & Son: Breaking Dad, alongside his son, Barney.

In addition to his television career, Walsh often appears in theatre shows, particularly pantomimes. As a singer, he has released two studio albums, Chasing Dreams (2016) and When You're Smiling (2017), that reached  10 and 11 in the UK Albums Chart, respectively.

Early life
Bradley John Walsh was born on 4 June 1960 in Watford, Hertfordshire, to a Scottish mother, Margaret, and her English husband Daniel. He grew up near Watford, in Leavesden, with his parents and sister Kerri. Walsh attended Francis Combe School, a comprehensive school in Garston, Hertfordshire where he was voted most likely to become a TV host. Leaving school at 16, Walsh got a job as an apprentice at Rolls-Royce's aircraft engine factory in Watford.

Career

Football career
Walsh started his youth football career at Wormley Rovers. In late 1979, at the age of 18, Walsh became a professional football player for Brentford although he failed to make the first team and was regularly a member of the reserves. While Walsh was at Brentford he also played for Barnet on loan, making five Southern Football League appearances in the 1979–80 season. He also played for Tring Town, Boreham Wood and Chalfont St Peter. Ankle fractures ended his football career at the age of 22, in 1982. He categorically denies reports that he played for Dunstable Town.

He participates in Soccer Aid, a charity football match where England takes on The Rest of the World with teams made up of celebrities and football legends. He helped England win the 2006 events as a player and the 2012 and 2016 events as a coach. Walsh made an episode for Soccer Aid in June 2022.

Television career
Following his football career, Walsh had a variety of jobs including working as a bluecoat at Pontins in Morecambe for three months. In October 1982, performing as a newcomer comedian, he came second in a talent contest at the Rolls-Royce Sports and Social Club in his home town of Leavesden.

Walsh was recruited by television channel ITV, who offered him the role as presenter on one of the network's new game shows, Midas Touch. In 1997, Walsh was asked to front the British adaptation of the popular US game show Wheel of Fortune following the decision of long-time presenter Nicky Campbell to leave the show after more than eight years.

Walsh's tenure on Wheel of Fortune lasted just one year, when he decided to turn his hand to acting. He also appeared on Lily Savage's Blankety Blank.

Acting
Walsh's first acting job was a minor role in the Channel 4 series, Lock, Stock.... He also appeared as Dave Dodds in the 2001 Channel 4 TV film Mike Bassett: England Manager. He returned to ITV in 2002, after landing a regular role in the short lived British soap opera Night and Day. He featured in a total of 52 episodes. In 2003, while appearing in Les Miserables in the West End, he played a minor role in an episode of The Bill spin-off series, M.I.T.: Murder Investigation Team.

On 31 May 2004, he made his first appearance in Coronation Street as factory boss Danny Baldwin. It was originally envisaged that Walsh's character would be called Vic, however, Walsh asked for the character's name to be changed to Danny after his late father. In December 2006, Walsh was written out of Coronation Street at his own request.

In October 2007, he appeared in TV drama Torn. In 2008, Walsh appeared in two episodes of Doctor Who spin-off The Sarah Jane Adventures, in the second story of series two, The Day of the Clown, as a sinister entity that fed off other people's fear. In his role, he played three parts of the same ego – a sinister American-sounding clown called Odd Bob, a mysterious European-sounding ringmaster called Elijah Spellman, and the infamous Pied Piper of Hamelin.

In January 2009, Walsh began appearing in ITV crime drama Law & Order: UK. Walsh plays the character of DS Ronnie Brooks, a recovering alcoholic who has been in the police force for more than twenty years. From 2009 until 2014, Walsh starred in a total of 53 episodes. After the eighth series, Walsh decided to take a break from the programme and ITV decided to rest the show, but it has not been cancelled and is simply on a hiatus. Walsh said he would "like the opportunity to pursue other drama projects which ITV are developing".

In May 2014, Walsh was cast as Brutus in a BBC One comedy series called SunTrap, starring alongside Kayvan Novak and Keith Allen. The show premiered on 27 May 2015.

In October 2017, the BBC announced that Walsh had been cast as a companion, Graham O'Brien, in the eleventh series of Doctor Who. He reprised the role for the twelfth series in 2020 and departed the programme in the 2021 New Year's Day special "Revolution of the Daleks". He also appears in the 2022 special "The Power of the Doctor".

In December 2020, it was announced that Walsh had been cast as Pop Larkin in The Larkins, a new six-part adaptation of The Darling Buds of May. He started appearing on The Larkins in October 2021.

Presenting
On 9 September 2007, Walsh hosted the countdown 50 Greatest Stars Polls on ITV, in which people had to vote for their favourite polls on celebrities. Later that year, on 29 December 2007, Walsh hosted the countdown for the No. 1 Soap Fan on ITV.

In August 2008, Walsh fronted his own ITV series entitled My Little Soldier, in which young contestants are required to do "grown-up things" such as travelling on their own by train. In November and December 2008, Walsh hosted another game show for ITV, called Spin Star.

In June 2009, Walsh became the presenter of ITV game show The Chase, as well as the celebrity editions of the programme. The Chase has become popular, beating rival BBC quiz show Pointless regularly. The show features contestants who take on the "Chaser" in a series of general knowledge quiz rounds. There have also been a number of series of celebrity versions of the show, also hosted by Walsh.

Walsh hosted a pilot for an American version of The Chase in 2012. However, it was decided that Brooke Burns would host the show instead.

Between 2010 and 2011, Walsh was the presenter of Saturday panel show Odd One In, with regular panellists Peter Andre and Jason Manford.

Since 2012, Walsh has hosted the Crime Thriller Awards on ITV3. He also hosted the Crime Thriller Club on ITV3 in 2013. Walsh also narrated a one-off documentary for ITV called The Circus.

In August 2014, Walsh hosted an ITV series called Come on Down! The Game Show Story, which looks back on the history of British game shows.

On 26 October 2014, after two successful pilots, Walsh began hosting the first series of Keep It in the Family. He returned to host a second series in 2015.

In 2014, Walsh presented an episode of Sunday Night at the Palladium. He returned to the show to present another episode in 2015. In 2016, he presented eight episodes of Tonight at the London Palladium, a spin-off from the Sunday night series. A second series began airing in April 2017. On 26 December 2014, Walsh hosted an entertainment special called A Christmas Cracker, filmed at the Hammersmith Apollo in London.

In May 2016, Walsh guest presented an episode of The One Show with Alex Jones. Also in 2016, Walsh began presenting Cash Trapped, a daytime game show for ITV. A second and third series aired in 2017 and 2019, respectively.

In 2017, Walsh guest-hosted five episodes of The Nightly Show on ITV, which aired from 3 to 7 April. On 1 May 2019, it was announced that Walsh would host a new late-night talk show on ITV, titled Bradley Walsh's Late Night Guestlist. The pilot episode, featuring guests Holly Willoughby, Maya Jama and Piers Morgan, aired on 11 May 2019. A full series was not commissioned.

In 2020, Walsh was announced as the host of a one-off festive revival of the game show Blankety Blank for the BBC. He has, from 2022. been the regular presenter of 
Blankety Blank.

Other appearances
In 1997, Walsh had spot in the Royal Gala celebrating 21 years of the Prince's Trust.

In 2005, Walsh was one of the victims of an Undercover in Series 5 of Ant & Dec's Saturday Night Takeaway. At the end of that Undercover, he "stormed off".

In 2007, Walsh took part in Northern Rock's All Star Golf Tournament on ITV, in which his team, Team Europe, won. Walsh stated that he has been playing golf since he was twenty years old.

In August 2008, Walsh appeared in talent show Maestro on BBC Two, where he was placed sixth.

Since 2015, Walsh has been a team captain on the sports-based panel show Play to the Whistle. Hosted by Holly Willoughby, the first series lasted for seven episodes, beginning in April 2015. The second series began in April 2016, followed by a third in 2017.

In 2020, Walsh was the "first ever double Undercover victim" in Series 16 of Ant & Dec's Saturday Night Takeaway.

In May 2022, Walsh appeared on BBC Radio 4's Desert Island Discs; his chosen favourite record, book, and luxury item were "Always and Forever" by Heatwave, The Count of Monte Cristo by Alexandre Dumas, and a set of golf clubs and balls respectively.

Singing career
Walsh approached rival game show host Alexander Armstrong to ask him for singing advice in 2016. The result, in November, was Walsh's release of his debut album, Chasing Dreams, which peaked at 10 on the UK Albums Chart. It consists of covers of jazz standards such as "That's Life" and "Mr. Bojangles" as well as the title track, an original song written by Walsh. It became the biggest-selling debut album by a British artist in 2016, selling 111,650 copies.

A year later, due to the success of Chasing Dreams, Walsh released a second album, When You're Smiling, consisting of more covers of traditional pop songs, and one original track. It reached 11 in the charts.

Personal life
Walsh married dancer Donna Derby in 1997. Together they have a son, Barney, with whom Walsh appeared in the travel series Bradley Walsh & Son: Breaking Dad. Walsh also has a daughter born 1982 from a previous relationship.

Walsh describes himself as "very spiritual" and attends church.

Filmography

Film

Television

Theatre credits

Discography

Studio albums

Awards and nominations

References

External links

 Official website
 
 
 Bradley Walsh Management – Debi Allen

 
1960 births
Living people
20th-century English comedians
21st-century English comedians
Association football forwards
Barnet F.C. players
Boreham Wood F.C. players
Brentford F.C. players
Chalfont St Peter A.F.C. players
English footballers
English game show hosts
English male comedians
English male soap opera actors
English people of Scottish descent
English television presenters
Isthmian League players
Male actors from Hertfordshire
Southern Football League players
Sportspeople from Watford
Actors from Watford
Musicians from Watford
Tring Athletic F.C. players